Pelu Ian Taele-Pavihi (born 28 September 1981, in Dunedin), also known as Pelu Taele, is a New Zealand-born Samoan and Niue international rugby union footballer. He is a  second row forward who joined Biarritz Olympique before the 2009–10 season.

Club career
Taele played for the Highlanders development squad in 2004 and represented Otago in the National Provincial Championship. He signed for Saracens in July 2006, with the intention of joining up with the squad after completing the New Zealand season with Otago. By the time he arrived in England, there was too much competition for his position at Saracens so he was loaned to Leeds Tykes. Taele then spent two seasons with Overmach Parma, where he was part of the team that won the Coppa Italia in both 2008 and 2009. Before the 2009–10 season Taele moved to Biarritz Olympique. In 2014 he signed a two-year deal with Aviron Bayonnais.

International career
Taele gained selection for the Samoan national side by virtue of his performances with Otago. He made his international debut against Tonga in July 2005 and was in the starting XV against England later the same year. He featured in the 2006 IRB Pacific 5 Nations squad with tests against the Junior All Blacks, Fiji, Tonga and Japan, and (as of November 2011) has eight caps in total.

References

1981 births
Living people
Rugby union players from Dunedin
Samoan rugby union players
Highlanders (rugby union) players
Otago rugby union players
Saracens F.C. players
Leeds Tykes players
Biarritz Olympique players
Expatriate rugby union players in France
New Zealand sportspeople of Samoan descent
New Zealand people of Niuean descent
Samoa international rugby union players
Rugby union locks